{{safesubst:#invoke:RfD||2=Nintendo DS & DSi Browser|month = February
|day = 21
|year = 2023
|time = 05:05
|timestamp = 20230221050544

|content=
REDIRECT Nintendo DS Browser

}}